Mansfield & District Light Railways was an electric tramway network operating in Mansfield from 16 July 1905 to  9 October 1932. The tramway company was a subsidiary of Midland Counties Electric Supply Company, who in turn were owned by Balfour Beatty.

History
On 18 November 1904, Mansfield Town Council concluded negotiations with the company promoting the tramway and authorised the start of construction.

The Pleasley and Nottingham Road sections of the Mansfield and District Light Railways were completed and inspected by General Trotter and Major Pringle of the Board of Trade on 11 July 1905 and opened for passenger traffic on the same day.

The service from Mansfield to Sutton was authorised to start on 21 December 1905

Infrastructure

The tramway network consisted of 5 routes covering just over 12 miles and joining neighbouring towns. 
These routes began in Mansfield's Market Place and went to Berry Hill, Crown Farm, Mansfield Woodhouse, Pleasley and via Sutton-in-Ashfield to Hucknall-under-Huthwaite.

The buildings and site are still in use as a motorbus depot.

Tramcars

The fleet comprised a total of 31 cars plus a water car. Livery was red and cream (light green and cream in later years). Two cars were purchased in 1912 from the Cavehill and Whitewell Tramway of Northern Ireland and two bought and one borrowed in 1930 from the nearby Nottinghamshire and Derbyshire Tramways Company, (another Midland Counties Electric Supply Co. subsidiary).

Closure

The tramway was largely rural in nature and it was replaced by motor buses, despite trolleybus authority having been obtained in 1929. 

In 1932 two trams (27 and 28) were sold to Sunderland Corporation Tramways, where they saw further service until 1953.

References

External links
 Mansfield & District Light Railways uniformed staff
 Mansfield & District Light Railways button

Rail transport in Nottinghamshire
Tram transport in England
Railway companies established in 1905
Mansfield
British companies established in 1905